Peter Robert Mitchell (born 6 April 1958) is an English professional golfer.

Mitchell was born in London. He turned professional at an early age in 1974, working in a club job before embarking on a tournament career several years later. He made his first appearance on the European Tour in 1979 and his last in 2003. In the early years he had difficulties holding on to his tour card, but in the thirteen-year stretch from 1988 to 2000 he finished in the top eighty of the European Tour Order of Merit every season, with a highest ranking of 12th in 1996. That same year he made his only appearance in the World Cup of Golf. He won three European Tour events: the 1992 Mitsubishi Austrian Open, the 1997 Madeira Island Open and the 1998 Portuguese Open.

Upon turning 50 in 2008, Mitchell joined the European Seniors Tour. He won three times during his rookie season, finishing in 3rd place on the Order of Merit, and won again the following year.

Professional wins (7)

European Tour wins (3)

*Note: The 1997 Madeira Island Open was shortened to 54 holes due to weather.

European Senior Tour wins (4)

Results in major championships

Note: Mitchell only played in The Open Championship.

CUT = missed the half-way cut
"T" indicates a tie for a place

Team appearances
World Cup (representing England): 1996

References

External links

Peter Mitchell Golf Academy – official site

English male golfers
European Tour golfers
European Senior Tour golfers
Golfers from London
People from Woodchurch, Kent
1958 births
Living people